Lynndie Rana England (born November 8, 1982) is a former United States Army Reserve soldier who was prosecuted for mistreating detainees during the Abu Ghraib torture and prisoner abuse that occurred at the Abu Ghraib prison in Baghdad during the Iraq War. She was one of 11 military personnel from the 372nd Military Police Company who were convicted in 2005 for war crimes.  After being sentenced to three years in prison and a dishonorable discharge, England was incarcerated from September 27, 2005, to March 1, 2007, when she was released on parole.

Early life
Born in Ashland, Kentucky, England moved with her family to Fort Ashby, West Virginia, when she was two years old. She was raised by her mother, Terrie Bowling England, and her father Kenneth R. England Jr., a railroad worker, who worked at a station in Cumberland, Maryland. She aspired to be a storm chaser. As a young child, England was diagnosed with selective mutism, a form of an anxiety disorder.

England joined the United States Army Reserve in Cumberland in 1999 while she was a junior at Frankfort High School near Short Gap. England worked as a cashier in an IGA store during her junior year of high school and married a co-worker in 2002, but they later divorced. England also wished to earn money for college, so that she could become a storm chaser. She was also a member of the Future Farmers of America. After graduating from Frankfort High School in 2001, she worked a night job in a chicken-processing factory in Moorefield. She was deployed to Iraq in June 2003.

England was engaged to fellow reservist and Abu Ghraib prison guard Charles Graner. In 2004, she gave birth to a son fathered by him at Womack Army Medical Center at Fort Bragg.

Involvement in prisoner abuse

England mobilized with her Army Reserve unit and was stationed in Baghdad at the Abu Ghraib prison in March 2003 to perform guard duties.  Along with other soldiers, she was investigated in late 2003 for mistreatment of Iraqi prisoners of war involving the infliction of sexual, physical and psychological abuse after photographs came to light showing prisoners being abused.

While formal charges were being prepared for general court-martial, England was transferred to the U.S. military installation at Fort Bragg, North Carolina, on March 18, 2004, because of her pregnancy.  Her court-martial was scheduled for September 2005 on charges of conspiracy to maltreat prisoners and assault consummated by battery.

On April 30, 2005, England agreed to plead guilty to four counts of maltreating prisoners, two counts of conspiracy, and one count of dereliction of duty. In exchange, prosecutors would have dropped two other charges, committing indecent acts and failure to obey a lawful order. This plea deal would have reduced her maximum sentence from 16 years to 11 years had it been accepted by the military judge. In May 2005, however, Military Judge Colonel James Pohl declared a mistrial on the grounds that he could not accept England's plea of guilty to a charge of conspiring with Graner to maltreat detainees because Graner had testified that he believed that, in placing a tether around a naked detainee's neck and asking England to pose for a photograph with him, he was documenting a legitimate use of force.  Graner was convicted on all charges and sentenced to 10 years in prison. At her retrial, England was convicted on September 26, 2005, of one count of conspiracy, four counts of maltreating detainees and one count of committing an indecent act. She was acquitted on a second conspiracy count. The next day, England was sentenced to a three-year prison term and a dishonorable discharge.

Members of the United States Senate have reportedly reviewed additional photographs supplied by the Department of Defense that have not been publicly released. There has been considerable speculation as to the contents of these photos. In a March 2008 interview, England stated in response to a question about these unreleased pictures, "You see the dogs biting the prisoners. Or you see bite marks from the dogs. You can see MPs holding down a prisoner so a medic can give him a shot."

England was incarcerated at Naval Consolidated Brig, Miramar.  She was paroled on March 1, 2007, after serving 521 days, less than 17 months. She remained on parole through September 2008 until her three-year sentence was complete, whereupon she was discharged.

In a May 11, 2004, interview with the Denver CBS owned-and-operated television station KCNC-TV, England reportedly said that she had been "instructed by persons in higher ranks" to commit acts of abuse as a form of psychological operations, and that she should keep doing it, because it worked as intended. England noted that she felt "weird" when a commanding officer asked her to do such things as "stand there, give the thumbs up, and smile." However, England felt that she was doing "nothing out of the ordinary."

Later life

After serving her sentence, England returned to Fort Ashby, West Virginia, and stayed with friends and family. 

On July 9, 2007, England was appointed to the Keyser, West Virginia volunteer recreation board. In July 2009, England released Tortured: Lynndie England, Abu Ghraib and the Photographs that Shocked the World, a biography that was set with a book tour that she hoped would rehabilitate her public image. As of 2009, England was on antidepressant medication and also had post-traumatic stress disorder and anxiety. As of 2013, she had found seasonal employment as a secretary.

In March 2008, England told the German magazine Stern that the media was to blame for the consequences of the Abu Ghraib scandal:

If the media hadn't exposed the pictures to that extent, then thousands of lives would have been saved ... Yeah, I took the photos but I didn't make it worldwide.

Asked about the picture of her posing with Graner in front of a pyramid of naked men, she said:

At the time I thought, I love this man [Graner], I trust this man with my life, okay, then he's saying, well, there's seven of them and it's such an enclosed area and it'll keep them together and contained because they have to concentrate on staying up on the pyramid instead of doing something to us.

Asked about the picture showing her pointing at a man forced to masturbate, she again referred to her feelings for Graner at the time:

Graner and Frederick tried to convince me to get into the picture with this guy. I didn't want to, but they were really persistent about it. At the time I didn't think that it was something that needed to be documented but I followed Graner. I did everything he wanted me to do. I didn't want to lose him.

In a 16 January 2009 interview with The Guardian, England reiterated:

... that she was goaded into posing for the photographs by her then lover and more senior fellow soldier, Charles Graner. 'They said in the trial that authority figures really intimidate me. I always aim to please.'

In 2012, following her release, she stated that she did not regret her actions. "Their (Iraqis') lives are better. They got the better end of the deal," she said. "They weren't innocent. They're trying to kill us, and you want me to apologize to them? It's like saying sorry to the enemy."

Gallery

See also
 Standard Operating Procedure

References

Further reading

 
 
  – A semi-fictionalized account of Lynndie England.

External links

 'What happens in war happens', a profile with the Guardian UK, January 3, 2009
 Symbol Of Shame? – a CBS News article, May 7, 2004
 "A new monster-in-chief" – Observer article by Mary Riddell, May 9, 2004
 
 This American Life – 384 Fall Guy
 Dickerscheid, P.J., and Vicki Smith, "Abu Ghraib scandal haunts Lynndie England", Military Times, June 29, 2009.

1982 births
21st-century American criminals
Living people
American people convicted of torture
American people convicted of war crimes
Criminals from Kentucky
Military personnel from Kentucky
Military personnel from West Virginia
Military police of the United States Army
People from Ashland, Kentucky
People from Mineral County, West Virginia
Photography in Iraq
People with post-traumatic stress disorder
Prisoners and detainees of the United States military
United States Army personnel of the Iraq War
United States Army personnel who were court-martialed
United States Army soldiers
United States military personnel at the Abu Ghraib prison
Women in the United States Army